Hajji Habiburrahman Shakir - also known by his nisba, al-Bulgari (Literary Tatar: Хәбибрахман Шакир, Xäbibraxman Şakir; December 10, 1903 - April 18, 1975) was an imam and publisher born in Russia, who became a part of the Finnish Tatar community when he arrived in Tampere during late 1940s. Shakir was known as a respected theologian in the Islamic world. Invited by the king of Saudi Arabia, Shakir made a pilgrimage to Mecca with his wife in 1972. Before his time in Finland, Shakir for example operated as a teacher in India, where one of his students was the later-president of Pakistan, Zulfikar Ali Bhutto.

Biography 
Habiburrahman Shakir (Xäbibraxman Şakir) was born in Russian Empire in 1903. Unlike other members of the Finnish Tatar community, Shakir was not from the Nizhny Novgorod region but most likely from Tatarstan. His exact birthplace is suspected to be the city of Bolgar due to a name he used as an imam, "al-Bulgari". Another viewpoint reminds that such a name (nisba) is not always a reference to ones birthplace and could rather signify ethnic roots; in this case, the Volga Bulgars.

During his younger years, Shakir studied theology for ten years at Bukhara, among other places. During the Russian Revolution, Shakir escaped to Kabul, where he met his future wife, Bibirehana Veliulla. (Bibiräyxanä Wäliulla).

In 1947, as recommended by Musa Bigiev, Shakir moved to Tampere, Finland, where he became the local Tatar community's imam. Before this, he operated as imam in Peshawar. In 1942, Shakir had worked as a teacher in Bombay, where one of his students was the future president of Pakistan, Zulfikar Ali Bhutto.

In Finland, Shakir also worked as a reporter and publisher. In 1949, Shakir started to publish a monthly magazine named Finlandiye Islam Mücellesi (later called Islam Mecellesı). It was read locally and also abroad. Some of his other publications are for example a work with Semiulla Wafin named Din derésleré ve Islam tarihçesé, and a booklet in honor of Gabdulla Tuqay with his close friend, artist Aisa Hakimcan. Shakir is known to have wrote poetry and some fiction as well. One of his plays was called "Niyaz beynin mirasi". Central themes of the play were fatalism and free will.

As an Islamic theologian, Shakir was well respected already before arriving in Finland. He was regularly visited by people who had questions about religion. The wide library of his was utilized as well, whenever needed. In addition to Tatar, Shakir also spoke Turkish, Arabic, Urdu and Persian.

Bibirehana Shakir was also a devoted Muslim. She helped especially the women of the Tatar community with religious matters. Bibirehana was the daughter of a known imam, Shamsulla Veliulla (Şämsulla Wäliulla), who during his life published 30 or so religious works in Kazan.

Habiburrahman made a pilgrimage to Mecca with his wife in 1972. During the trip, they met the king of Saudi Arabia, who had originally invited them. Shakir died in 1975, Bibirehana a year before. They are buried at the Helsinki Islamic Cemetery.

Finnish Tatar language teacher Hamide Çaydam is the daughter of Shakir.

Some publications 
 Finlandiyä İslām Mäğälläse (1949-;  Shakir / Fatih Arat) 
 Törek ïruģlarï (1950; Shakir / Zuhur Tahir) 
 Islam mecellesı (1950-1951; Shakir / Ymär Sali) 
 Din derésleré ve Islam tarihçesé (1962; Shakir / Semiulla Wafin) 
 Abdulla Tukay (1966; Shakir / Aisa Hakimcan) 
 Šarä'it al-īmān (1966; Shakir / Hadice Arifulla)

Sources 
 Baibulat, Muazzez: Tampereen Islamilainen Seurakunta: juuret ja historia. Gummerus Kirjapaino Oy, 2004. ISBN 952-91-6753-9.
 Bedretdin, Kadriye: Tugan Tel: Kirjoituksia Suomen Tataareista. Suomen Itämainen Seura, 2011. ISBN 978-951-9380-78-0.

References

External links 
 Татарский имам Хабибурахман Шакир: как учитель будущего президента Пакистана оказался в Стране тысячи озер
 Хабибурахман Шакир: тернистый путь в страну тысячи озер
 Хабибуррахман Шакир: тернистый путь в страну тысячи озер. Часть 2

Finnish Tatars
Imams
Islamic theology
1903 births
1975 deaths